Carabella is a genus of Panamanian jumping spiders that was first described by Arthur Merton Chickering in 1946.  it contains only two species, found only in Panama: C. banksi and C. insignis.

References

Endemic fauna of Panama
Salticidae
Salticidae genera
Spiders of Central America